Transcriptional enhancer factor TEF-5 is a protein that in humans is encoded by the TEAD3 gene.

Function 

This gene product is a member of the transcriptional enhancer factor (TEF) family of transcription factors, which contain the TEA/ATTS DNA-binding domain. Members of the family in mammals are TEAD1, TEAD2, TEAD3, TEAD4. Transcriptional coregulators, such as WWTR1 (TAZ) bind to these transcription factors. TEAD3 is predominantly expressed in the placenta and is involved in the transactivation of the chorionic somatomammotropin-B gene enhancer. It is expressed in nervous system and muscle in fish embryos. Translation of this protein is initiated at a non-AUG (AUA) start codon.

References

Further reading

External links 
 

Transcription factors